Synergy Baku Cycling Project was an Azerbaijani UCI Continental cycling team managed by Jeremy Hunt and sponsored by Synergy Group.

Team roster

Major wins

2013
 Road Race Championships, Samir Jabrayilov
 Time Trial Championships, Elchin Asadov
Stage 1 Tour de Taiwan, Kirill Pozdnyakov
Stage 1 Tour of Thailand, Rico Rogers
Stage 1 Tour d'Azerbaïdjan, Christoph Schweizer
Stage 4 Rás Tailteann, Kirill Pozdnyakov
Stage 6 Rás Tailteann, Rico Rogers
Stage 1 Jelajah Malaysia, Kirill Pozdnyakov
Stage 5 Jelajah Malaysia, Samir Jabrayilov
Stage 1 Tour de East Java, Anuar Manan
Stage 3 Tour de East Java, John Ebsen
 Overall Tour of China I, Kirill Pozdnyakov
Stage 6, Kirill Pozdnyakov
Stage 6 Tour of China II, Rico Rogers
2014
 Time Trial Championships, Elchin Asadov
 Road Race Championships, Elchin Asadov
Poreč Trophy, Maksym Averin
Stage 4 Tour de Bretagne, Markus Eibegger
Stage 3 Rás Tailteann, Jan Sokol
Stage 6 Rás Tailteann, Markus Eibegger
2015
 Overall Istrian Spring Trophy, Markus Eibegger
Stage 2, Markus Eibegger
Team classification Tour d'Azerbaïdjan
Stage 2 Tour de Bretagne, Matej Mugerli
 Road Race Championships, Maksym Averin
 Time Trial Championships, Maksym Averin
Stage 2 Okolo Slovenska, Maksym Averin
 Time Trial Championships, Ioannis Tamouridis
2016
Poreč Trophy, Matej Mugerli
Stage 3 Istrian Spring Trophy, Matej Mugerli
 Overall Tour of Croatia, Matija Kvasina
Team classification Tour of Croatia
Stage 2 Tour d'Azerbaïdjan, Maksym Averin
Stage 3 Tour d'Azerbaïdjan, Matej Mugerli
Team classification Tour d'Azerbaïdjan
 Road Race Championships, Maksym Averin
 Time Trial Championships, Maksym Averin
 Time Trial Championships, Ioannis Tamouridis
 Time Trial Championships, Matija Kvasina
Stage 3 (ITT) Sibiu Cycling Tour, Kirill Pozdnyakov
2017
Stages 1, 4 & 7 Tour du Maroc, Kirill Pozdnyakov
 Overall Tour d'Azerbaïdjan, Kirill Pozdnyakov
Stage 2, Kirill Pozdnyakov
 Road Race Championships, Josip Rumac
 Road Race Championships, Kirill Pozdnyakov
 Time Trial Championships, Maksym Averin
2018
Grand Prix Alanya, Kirill Pozdnyakov
Stage 1 Tour of Mersin, Kirill Pozdnyakov
Stage 4 Five Rings of Moscow, Kirill Pozdnyakov

National champions

2013
 Azerbaijan Road Race, Samir Jabrayilov
 Azerbaijan Time Trial, Elchin Asadov
2014
 Azerbaijan Time Trial, Elchin Asadov
 Azerbaijan Road Race, Elchin Asadov
2015
 Azerbaijan Road Race, Maksym Averin
 Azerbaijan Time Trial, Maksym Averin
 Greece Time Trial, Ioannis Tamouridis
2016
 Azerbaijan Road Race, Maksym Averin
 Azerbaijan Time Trial, Maksym Averin
 Greece Time Trial, Ioannis Tamouridis
 Croatia Time Trial, Matija Kvasina
2017
 Croatia Road Race, Josip Rumac
 Azerbaijan Road Race, Kirill Pozdnyakov
 Azerbaijan Time Trial, Maksym Averin

References

External links
Synergy Baku Cycling Project's Team List in Cycling Fever

UCI Continental Teams (Europe)
Cycling teams established in 2013
Cycling teams based in Azerbaijan
2013 establishments in Azerbaijan